Mariana Coromoto Jiménez Martínez (born December 1, 1993, in Caracas) is a Venezuelan model and beauty pageant titleholder who won Miss Venezuela 2014 in which she represented Guárico, and also she represented Venezuela at the Miss Universe 2015, finishing as a top 10 finalist. She is currently in New York, working on her new role as a model and she has participated at NYFW as a model of Agatha Ruiz de la Prada, Douglas Tapia and Benito Santos.

Personal life
Mariana Jiménez is majoring in Social Communications at university in Caracas.

Pageantry

Miss Grand Venezuela 2013
Mariana Jiménez was designated as Miss Grand Venezuela and represented her country at Miss Grand International in 2013 edition in Bangkok, Thailand. At the pageant, she was placed as a Top 10 finalist.

Miss Venezuela 2014
Mariana Jiménez, who stands 1.79 (5 ft 10 in), competed as Miss Guárico 2014, one of 25 finalists in her country's national beauty pageant, she obtained the Miss Piernas de Venus award at the Interactive Beauty Gala, which was the preliminary of Miss Venezuela 2014, which was held on October 9, 2014, in Caracas, where she obtained the Miss Photogenic award and she became the tenth Miss Venezuela winner from Guárico, gaining the right to represent her country in Miss Universe 2015.

Miss Universe 2015
Mariana Jiménez represented Venezuela at Miss Universe 2015 which was held on Sunday, December 20, 2015, at The AXIS in Las Vegas, Nevada, USA, in where she placed in Top 10 finalists.

See also
 Miss Venezuela 2014

References

External links
Miss Venezuela Official Website
Miss Venezuela La Nueva Era MB

1993 births
Living people
Miss Universe 2015 contestants
People from La Guaira
Venezuelan beauty pageant winners
Venezuelan female models
Miss Venezuela winners
Miss Grand International contestants